Angela Glynne (7 September 1933 in Middlesex, England – 22 April 2008 in Northridge, California aged 74) was a British film actress.

Selected filmography
 Bank Holiday (1938)
 Those Kids from Town (1942)
 Gert and Daisy Clean Up (1942)
 Hard Steel (1942)
 Rose of Tralee (1942)
 Fortune Lane (1947)
 The Happiest Days of Your Life (1950)
 One Good Turn (1951)
 The House Across the Lake (1954)

References

External links

1933 births
2008 deaths
British film actresses